The 1997 UEFA Cup Final was a two-legged football match contested between Schalke 04 of Germany and Inter Milan of Italy. The tie was a tight affair, with each leg being won 1–0 by the home-team. After 210 minutes of football, the tie was eventually settled on penalties, with Schalke winning 4–1 at the Stadio Giuseppe Meazza. It was to be the last UEFA Cup final to be played over two legs, future finals being one-off games at a neutral ground.

Route to the final

Match

Details

First leg

Second leg

See also
1996–97 UEFA Cup
FC Schalke 04 in European football
Inter Milan in European football

External links
1996–97 season at UEFA.com

2
International club association football competitions hosted by Italy
International club association football competitions hosted by Germany
FC Schalke 04 matches
Inter Milan matches
1997
UEFA Cup Final 1997
1996–97 in German football
1996–97 in Italian football
Final
1990s in Milan
May 1997 sports events in Europe
Sports competitions in Gelsenkirchen
20th century in Gelsenkirchen
1990s in North Rhine-Westphalia
Sports competitions in Milan